Cherif Ndiaye (born 23 January 1996) is a Senegalese footballer who plays as a forward for Turkish club Adana Demirspor on loan from the Chinese club Shanghai Port.

Professional career
Ndiaye joined Waasland-Beveren from the Senegalese club Grand Yoff FC. He made his debut for Waasland-Beveren in a 1–0 loss on 21 January 2017 to K.V. Oostende.

On 28 January 2023, Ndiaye returned to Turkey on loan to Adana Demirspor with an option to buy.

Career Statistics

References

External links
Ndiaye Maxifoot Profile
maxifoot

1996 births
Footballers from Dakar
Living people
Senegalese footballers
Association football forwards
S.K. Beveren players
HNK Gorica players
Göztepe S.K. footballers
Shanghai Port F.C. players
Adana Demirspor footballers
Belgian Pro League players
Croatian Football League players
Süper Lig players
Chinese Super League players
Senegalese expatriate footballers
Expatriate footballers in Belgium
Senegalese expatriate sportspeople in Belgium
Expatriate footballers in Croatia
Senegalese expatriate sportspeople in Croatia
Expatriate footballers in Turkey
Senegalese expatriate sportspeople in Turkey
Expatriate footballers in China
Senegalese expatriate sportspeople in China